The Bujorul is a right tributary of the river Chineja in Romania. It flows into the Chineja in the town Târgu Bujor.

References

Rivers of Romania
Rivers of Galați County
Tributaries of the Chineja